Arhyssus nigristernum is a species of scentless plant bug in the family Rhopalidae. It is found in North America.

References

Further reading

 

Articles created by Qbugbot
Insects described in 1859
Rhopalinae
Hemiptera of North America